Ephraim King Wilson II (December 22, 1821February 24, 1891) the son of Ephraim King Wilson, was a Congressional Representative and a Senator from Maryland.

Biography
Ephraim King Wilson II was born in Snow Hill, Maryland, and attended Union Academy at Snow Hill and Washington Academy in Princess Anne, Maryland. He graduated from Jefferson College in 1840 and taught school for six years.  He studied law and was admitted to the bar in 1848 and began a practice in Snow Hill.

He was a member of the State House of Delegates in 1847 and presidential elector on the Democratic ticket in 1852.  Because of ill health he abandoned his law practice in 1867 and retired to his farm. In 1868 he was the examiner and treasurer of the school board of Worcester County, Maryland and was elected as a Democrat to the Forty-third Congress from Maryland's 1st congressional district of Maryland in 1873.  He declined to be a candidate for re-nomination in 1874.  He was a judge of the first judicial circuit of Maryland from 1878 to 1884 and elected as a Democrat in 1884 to the United States Senate, serving from March 4, 1885 until his death in Washington on February 24, 1891.

He was the grandson of American Revolutionary War hero John Gunby and also the adoptive father of future Governor of Maryland, John Walter Smith.  He is buried in the churchyard of Makemie Memorial Presbyterian Church in Snow Hill.

See also
List of United States Congress members who died in office (1790–1899)

References

External links

1821 births
1891 deaths
Democratic Party members of the Maryland House of Delegates
People from Snow Hill, Maryland
Washington & Jefferson College alumni
Democratic Party United States senators from Maryland
Democratic Party members of the United States House of Representatives from Maryland
People from Princess Anne, Maryland
1852 United States presidential electors
19th-century American politicians
19th-century American judges